Brantford Redskins was a Canadian football team in the Ontario Rugby Football Union. The team played in the 1952 and 1953 seasons. Their quarterback in 1952 was Al Dekdebrun, who had led the Toronto Argonauts to a Grey Cup win in 1950.

Notable players
 Al Dekdebrun
 Frank Gnup
 Tom Moran

ORFU season-by-season

Defunct Canadian football teams
Ind
Ontario Rugby Football Union teams
Sport in Brantford
1952 establishments in Ontario
1953 disestablishments in Ontario
Sports clubs established in 1952
Sports clubs disestablished in 1953